Zekari Pass (also Zikar Pass in some older texts) is a  high mountain pass located in Georgia's Meskheti Range on the border of the Imereti and Samtskhe-Javakheti regions. Though used as a 'caravan' route since times immemorial, the road across the pass remains unpaved, suitable only for off-road vehicles and is usually impassable from October to June.

History
In August 1893, British parliamentarian and explorer H. F. B. Lynch took this route between Kutais and Akhaltsykh, expounding: I doubt whether there exists in the nearer Asia a standpoint which commands a prospect at once so grand and so instructive as that which is unfolded from the summit of the Zikar Pass.

References

Mountain passes of Georgia (country)